The 2007–08 Football League Cup (known as the Carling Cup for sponsorship reasons) was the 48th staging of the Football League Cup, a knock-out competition for the top 92 football clubs played in English football league system. The winners qualified for the first round of the 2008–09 UEFA Cup, if not already qualified for European competitions.

The competition began on 13 August 2007, and ended with the final on 24 February 2008. Wembley Stadium in London hosted the final match for the first time since its major renovation completed.

The tournament was won by Tottenham Hotspur, who beat holders Chelsea 2–1 in the final, thanks to goals from Dimitar Berbatov and Jonathan Woodgate. Didier Drogba scored the opener for Chelsea. The title, as of 2022, is the most recent major trophy won by Tottenham.

First round 
The 72 Football League clubs started in the first round, which was divided into North and South sections. Each section was divided equally into a pot of seeded clubs and a pot of unseeded clubs. Clubs' rankings depended upon their finishing position in the 2006–07 season. Therefore, the clubs relegated from the Premier League in 2007; Watford, Charlton Athletic (south) and Sheffield United (north) were the top seeds, and the clubs newly promoted to the Football League, Morecambe and Dagenham & Redbridge, were bottom seeds in north and south sections respectively.

 On 13 June 2007 seeded clubs and unseeded clubs were paired off to create the first round draw.
 Matches occurred during the week commencing 13 August 2007.
 Extra time played when the scores were level after 90 minutes.

1 Score after 90 minutes

Second round 
The 36 winners from the first round joined the 12 Premier League clubs not participating in European competitions in the second round.

 Round two was drawn on 16 August.
 Matches occurred during the week commencing 28 August.
 Extra time played when the scores were level after 90 minutes.

1 Score after 90 minutes
2 As Nottingham Forest were leading 1–0 at the time of the abandonment of the first meeting, they were given a "free goal" by Leicester City, who allowed Forest goalkeeper Paul Smith to dribble up the pitch uncontested and score straight from the kick-off.

Third round 
The 24 winners from the second round joined the eight Premier League clubs participating in European competitions in the third round. The draw was made on 1 September. Matches were played on 25 September and 26 September.

1 Score after 90 minutes

Fourth round 
The draw for the fourth round was made on 29 September 2007 and matches were played in the week commencing 29 October.

1 Score after 90 minutes

Fifth round 
The draw for the fifth round was made on 3 November 2007. Matches were played in the week beginning 17 December 2007, with the exception of the match between West Ham United and Everton, which was played on 12 December due to Everton's commitments in the UEFA Cup.

Semi-finals 
The semi-final draw was made on 19 December 2007 at 22:00 GMT. Unlike the other rounds, the semi-final ties were played over two legs, with each team playing one leg at home. The ties were played in the weeks beginning 9 January and 21 January 2008.

First leg

Second leg 

Chelsea won 3–1 on aggregate

Tottenham won 6–2 on aggregate

Final 

The 2008 League Cup Final was played on 24 February 2008 and was the first to be played at Wembley Stadium since 2000.

References 

EFL Cup seasons
Cup
Football League Cup